Elton Divino Celio (born 7 July 1987 in Guaíra, Paraná), commonly known as Eltinho, is a Brazilian footballer who plays for Londrina as a left back.

Career
On signing for the team Eltinho was involved in a small scandal regarding his actual age. The Yokohama F. Marinos website stated his date of birth was July 7, 1987 but the website of his former club Paraná stated his date of birth as 1983. The Paraná Clube website has subsequently been removed. This anomaly was discovered by the supporters group MOIST (Marinos Official International Supporters Team).

Eltinho's favourite player is Ronaldo and his hobby is watching movies.

Club statistics
(Correct  December 6, 2009)

according to combined sources on the.

Contract
Flamengo 30 July 2008 to 31 December 2009.

References

External links
 
 CBF
 Eltinho at BDFA 
 Eltinho moves to Flamengo (lancenet.com.br) 

1987 births
Living people
Brazilian footballers
Sportspeople from Paraná (state)
Paraná Clube players
Yokohama F. Marinos players
CR Flamengo footballers
Avaí FC players
Sport Club Internacional players
Coritiba Foot Ball Club players
Clube Náutico Capibaribe players
J1 League players
Desportivo Brasil players
Campeonato Brasileiro Série A players
Brazilian expatriate footballers
Brazilian expatriate sportspeople in Japan
Expatriate footballers in Japan
Association football defenders